UFO sightings in outer space are sightings of unidentified flying objects reported by astronauts while in space that they could not explain at the time. These sightings have been claimed as evidence for alien visits by ufologists. 

Some of the alleged sightings never occurred: science fiction writer Otto Binder perpetuated a hoax claiming Apollo 11 Commander Neil Armstrong had encountered UFOs during the Apollo mission. UFO proponents see comments by astronauts or photos processed by NASA as one of the "strongest bodies of evidence" because they are considered to be of high trustworthiness; however, NASA Assistant Administrator for Legislative Affairs, Robert F. Allnut, concluded in a 1970 letter, "after fifteen years of manned space voyages including space stations and landing on the Moon, spacemen have brought back not a shred of evidence – verbal, photographic, or otherwise – for the existence of extraterrestrial spacecraft, or 'UFOs'."

In 2009, footage from NASA was posted on YouTube by ufologists which "renew[ed] UFO conspiracy theories that the government is hiding knowledge about its interactions with intelligent life" by relying on a "lack of context" to promote a "collection of indistinct imagery and allegations". A number of the incidents were collected for an episode of the 2014 television series Are We Alone?.

Incidents
Some sightings involving astronauts or NASA include:

During the Gemini 4 mission, pilot Jim McDivitt spotted an object that he described as a "white cylindrical shape with a white pole sticking out of one corner of it." He took two pictures of it. His partner, Ed White, was asleep at the time. McDivitt maintains that it was some unknown but man-made piece of debris, while James Oberg argues that it was most likely the Titan II second stage of the craft.

In a transcript of Gemini 7 mission, the astronauts mention a "bogey" which ufologists have claimed was a reference to a UFO. Oberg, based on his trajectory analysis of the  mission, describes the astronauts' comments about a "bogey" as referring to booster-associated debris, and not a reference to some sort of UFO. The astronaut who made the comments, Frank Borman, later confirmed that what he saw was not a UFO, and that when he offered to go on the television show Unsolved Mysteries to clarify, the producers told him, "Well, I'm not sure we want you on the program."

Within the UFO community, stories have spread that Neil Armstrong was reported to have witnessed multiple UFOs during Apollo 11. An explanation was that the sightings could have been attributed to jettisoned components. Additional stories were accredited to a hoax spread by science fiction writer Otto Binder. Buzz Aldrin says his words were taken out of context from an interview in 2005 about the incident.

During a 2005 spacewalk outside the International Space Station, astronaut Leroy Chiao reported seeing lights  in a formation he described as "in a line" and "almost like an upside-down check mark". The incident was promoted as a possible UFO sighting in the television series Are We Alone?.   Chiao later identified the lights as being from  fishing boats "hundreds of miles below".

In August 2013, according to NASA TV, astronaut Christopher Cassidy saw a UFO float past the International Space Station near its Progress 52 cargo ship. It was soon identified by Russian flight controllers as an antenna cover from the Zvezda service module.

On August 19, 2020, Cosmonaut Ivan Vagner posted a video on Twitter featuring UFOs on a time lapse he recorded of the Aurora Australis. Vagner dubbed the objects "space guests" with Roscosmos quote tweeting Vagner to say “An interesting and at the same time mysterious video made by the cosmonaut of Roscosmos Ivan Wagner from the International Space Station.”

See also
 List of reported UFO sightings
 STS-48#Ice particles

References

Further reading

 
 
 
 
  (excerpt from )

External links

Spaceflight
outer space
Unidentified flying objects
Outer space